Helena Ranaldi Nogueira (born May 24, 1966) is a Brazilian actress.

Biography 

After doing some modeling jobs and television commercials, she was ranked among the five finalists of Supermodel of the World - Step Brazil, 1989, sponsored by Class Modelos and Ford Models the U.S. (the first of that year was with model Adriana de Oliveira). With the money she earned she took a course in theater acting. At age 23 she moved from São Paulo to Rio de Janeiro.

In her first work, in 1990, she portrayed Stefânia in the soap opera A História de Ana Raio e Zé Trovão, although the former Rede Manchete. The following year, she acted in another soap opera on TV network, Amazônia, before moving to the rival Rede Globo.

In 1992, already hired by Rede Globo, she played Nina in Despedida de Solteiro. A year later, during the recording of the soap opera Olho no Olho, she met director Ricardo Waddington, whom she married; they had a son, Pedro.

In 1996, came to present the Fantástico alongside Pedro Bial, but the experience was short-lived because in July she received the invitation to act in the soap opera Anjo de Mim, directed by her husband, emerging as one of the central characters.

In 2000, inicou a result of great work with the author Manoel Carlos, which were: Laços de Família (2000), such as veteran turrona Cíntia; Presença de Anita (2001) as Lúcia, Nando writer's wife, played by José Mayer, who falls for this nymphet Anita, played by then newcomer Mel Lisboa, and Mulheres Apaixonadas (2003), such as Physical Education teacher Raquel, who becomes involved with a student of the college where she works, and also runs the ex-abusive husband, the author of several beatings by her.

In 2002 she was the protagonist of the novella Coração de Estudante, who lived in Clara and the young lawyer in 2004, participated in the miniseries Um Só Coração, as the Jewish Lídia, who lives an intense love and forbidden to Frederico.

In 2008, she portrayed a tormented Dedina, First Lady of Triunfo, the fictional town of A Favorita. Throughout the novel, her character ends up getting involved with the worker Damião (Malvino Salvador), best friend of her husband, mayor Elias.

In 2012 the actress played in the novel (Fina Estampa) Chiara Passarelli a cold woman, a model who left her husband Juan Guilherme (Carlos Casagrande) and son Fábio (Guilherme Leicam) and settled in Italy, but the character discovers that she has aneurysm and has a few days and then return to Brazil to spend "her Last Days" alongside her son and her ex-husband, but with the return of Chiara her ex-husband has her relationship with Letícia (Tania Khalill) shaken. In 2014, the novelist returns partnership with Manoel Carlos, this time living pianist Verônica in the novel Em Família.

In 2015, she participates in the series As Canalhas, from GNT, where she makes a teacher who engages with a student. In the same year she made a special and very funny participation in the CQC program, of Band, where she remembered the character Raquel, of Mulheres Apaizonadas, together with Dan Stulbach. Still in 2015, he dedicated himself to the theater making two plays (A Fantástica Fábrica de Bonecas and Amores Urbanos).

In 2016, Rede Globo reserved its name for the novel À Flor da Pele, provisional name of Glória Perez's A Força do Querer, but its participation in the plot was not carried out.

Personal life 
The actress was married to Ricardo Waddington, a Globo TV soap opera and series director, with whom she lived for ten years and had a son, Pedro. The couple separated in January 2004. According to them, they get along really well and the reason for their separation, and consequent divorce, was a natural drifting away from one another.

Filmography

Television

Films

Theater

References

External links 

1966 births
Living people
Actresses from São Paulo
Brazilian telenovela actresses
Brazilian film actresses
Brazilian stage actresses
Brazilian female models